Lüleburgaz (Modern Greek: Λουλέ Μπουργκάς Lule Burgas, Bulgarian: Люлебургаз Lyuleburgaz), Bergoulion (Ancient Greek: Βεργούλιον) or Arcadiopolis (Ancient Greek: Αρκαδιόυπολις Arkadiópolis) is the largest city and district of Kırklareli Province in the Marmara region of Turkey. Located near the border with Bulgaria and Greece within the historic region of East Thrace in Rumelia, the city is home to many Balkan Turks from Albania, Bulgaria, Greece, Romania and ex-Yugoslavia who immigrated to Turkey since the 19th century.

Lüleburgaz is a hub for road and rail transportation, with the city being connected to Istanbul and Edirne by the Istanbul-Kapikule Regional Train and to Plovdiv, Sofia, Belgrade, Bucharest and Budapest by the Bosphorus Express and the Istanbul-Sofia Express.

The city has an urban population of 122,635 (2021 census). Its  best known attraction is the 16th-century Sokollu Mehmed Pasha Mosque, named after the Grand Vizier Mehmet Paşa Sokolović and designed by the Ottoman chief architect Mimar Sinan who also designed a bridge for the city.

History

The city used to be the capital of the Roman province of Europa, established by the Roman Emperor Diocletian in 294.

The city's ancient name was Bergula but Emperor Theodosius I changed it to Arcadiopolis in honour of his son and successor Arcadius. The city of Arcadiopolis fell to Attila the Hun during his campaign against the Eastern Roman Empire in 443 AD.

During the revolt of Thomas the Slav against Michael II, the city was Thomas' last refuge after the defection of his troops in 823. Michael II invested the city and after more than five months of siege, the exhausted and starving troops gave up their leader in exchange for an imperial pardon. Thomas was handed over on a donkey and tortured.

The Battle of Arcadiopolis of 970 saw the Byzantine forces defeat an invading Kievan-Pecheneg-Magyar force who were aiming to capture Constantinople,  to the east.

As the capital of the Roman province of Europa, Acradiopolis had its own bishop, who was recorded as attending a number of important church councils; it was noted as an autocephalous archbishopric by the seventh century.  It is no longer a residential bishopric, although the Diocese of Arcadiopolis survives as a Roman Catholic titular see. Marcel Lefebvre, the founder of the Society of Saint Pius X, was one of its titular bishops.

The Battle of Lüleburgas was fought between 28 October and 2 November 1912 during the First Balkan War. The city was occupied by the Greek army between 1920 and 1922, before becoming part of the Modern Turkish Republic.

Economy

The economy of Lüleburgaz is mainly based on the industrial sector and agriculture. There are various factories around the city.

Pharmaceutical industry 
Pharmaceutical companies such as Sanofi-Aventis, Deva Holding A.S. and Zentiva have their main manufacturers within the urban area of Lüleburgaz.

Agriculture 
Crops widely grown around Lüleburgaz include wheat, corn and sunflowers, with the latter being one of the symbols of the city. Trakya Birlik, with its headquarters in the city, is one of Turkey's main sunflower oil producers.

Glass production 
Şişecam, Turkey's leading glass producer, has a factory in Lüleburgaz. as does its East Thracian division Trakya Cam.

Sport
Founded in 2007, the women's football club, Düvenciler Lisesispor, played in the Turkish Women's First Football League after promotion from the Second League. In 2011 the team changed its name to Lüleburgaz 39 Spor and its colours from yellow-black to red-green. The club ended its participation in the league in the 2013-14 season.

Culture
The city and the Battle of Lüleburgas feature in Marcel Proust's Time Regained, the final chapter of Remembrance of Things Past, published in 1927.

The festival of koliada is historically celebrated in the city in the month of January.

Media companies
The city of Lüleburgaz is home to several local media agencies including the centre-left Lüleburgaz Görünüm Gazetesi and Lüleburgaz Haber.

Politics
Lüleburgaz is one of the most pro-European cities of Turkey; mayoral candidates advocating tighter integration with the European Union dominate during elections.

Historically, the centre-left, secular and pro-European Republican People's Party (CHP) has dominated city politics. In the 2017 Turkish constitutional referendum, 72.89% of the population of Lüleburgaz voted "no". In the 2018 Turkish general election the most popular party was the CHP which received 51.38% of the vote.  The liberal democratic Nation Alliance received 64.80% of the votes in the city. In the 2019 Turkish local elections the most popular candidate was Murat Gerenli of the CHP which received 66.55% of the vote.

Famous residents

 Ahmet Özacar, Turkish footballer
 Candan Erçetin, Turkish singer-songwriter of Kosovar-Macedonian descent that represented Turkey in the Eurovision Song Contest 1986, recipient of the Ordre des Arts et des Lettres for her contributions to France–Turkey relations

Twin towns – sister cities
Lüleburgaz is twinned with:
  Silistra
  Popovo

See also
 Battle of Lule Burgas
 Bergule
 Europa
 Rumelia

References

Bibliography
 Bergulae Dictionary of Greek and Roman Geography
 Arcadiopolis founded by Arcadius

External links

 Official Website of the City of Lüleburgaz

Populated places in Kırklareli Province
Districts of Kırklareli Province